General transcription factor II-I is a protein that in humans is encoded by the GTF2I gene.

Function 

This gene encodes a multifunctional phosphoprotein, TFII-I, with roles in transcription and signal transduction. Haploinsuffiency (deletion of one copy) of the GTF2I gene is noted in Williams-Beuren syndrome, a multisystem developmental disorder caused by the deletion of contiguous genes at chromosome 7q11.23. It is duplicated in the 7q11.23 duplication syndrome. The exon(s) encoding 5' UTR has not been fully defined, but this gene is known to contain at least 34 exons, and its alternative splicing generates 4 transcript variants in humans. A single gain-of-function point mutation in GTF2I is also found in certain Thymomas.  Single nucleotide polymorphism (SNP) in GTF2I is correlated to autoimmune disorders.

Interactions 

GTF2I has been shown to interact with:

 Bruton's tyrosine kinase,
 HDAC3, 
 Histone deacetylase 2, 
 MAPK3, 
 Myc, 
 PRKG1, 
 Serum response factor  and
 USF1 (human gene).

References

Further reading

External links 
 

Transcription factors